Alameda East Veterinary Hospital is a veterinary hospital located in Denver, Colorado, United States.

History
Alameda East was founded and built in 1971 by Dr. Robert A. Taylor, DVM/MS.  Taylor, at the time a recent veterinary school graduate, was somewhat frustrated at the level of critical care and technological services that were available to animals in the private sector as opposed to the high-end facilities of a university hospital.  Determined to bring this level of care and technique to the average pet owner, Taylor decided to make Alameda East a full-service hospital facility, with round-the-clock staffing, an intensive care unit, surgical and radiological equipment, and internal medicine specialist physicians.  The hospital first began 24-hour service in 1974, with Taylor and a handful of young doctors and veterinary technicians working virtually non-stop for months.  The practice began offering internships to vet school grads to fill its increasing needs for staff and worked closely with the Bel-Rea Institute in Denver, Colorado, to offer residency-style positions to veterinary technician graduates from Bel-Rea. Within 10 years, Alameda East had grown to become one of the largest animal hospitals in the United States.

In 1997, with the popularity of the NBC series ER on the rise, the cable network Animal Planet approached Taylor about doing a reality series based on emergency care for animals, much like AP's sister network TLC was doing with its new ER-based reality show Trauma: Life in the E.R.  Taylor agreed, and Emergency Vets debuted in 1998.  The show became an instant hit on Animal Planet, and at its peak alternated with The Crocodile Hunter as the network's #1 show.  This exposed the hospital to a population outside the American southwest, and attracted both patients and doctors to the hospital. First-run production on Emergency Vets ended in 2002 after Taylor began putting plans together for expansion of the hospital that would have been hindered by the constant presence of a TV crew on-site during construction.

In 2003, Alameda East Veterinary Hospital moved into a new facility next to the original hospital, expanding an additional .  In addition to the normal patient visitation rooms and cages of a regular veterinary practice, the new facility offers four surgical suites, CT and MRI equipment, a full-service ICU and pathology laboratory, a physical therapy suite, and a boarding facility called "Animal Lodge". In March 2007, Alameda East Veterinary Hospital and VCA Antech announced that AEVH will now operate as part of the VCA Hospital Network.

Legacy
Alameda East has been featured in five shows from the Animal Planet television network:
Emergency Vets, a series about the lives of Alameda East's veterinarians and the animals they treated, which aired first-run episodes from 1998 to 2002
 E-Vets: The Cutting Edge, a one-off documentary produced in 2004, updating what had happened to Alameda East and its veterinarians since the original series ended
 Emergency Vets 20 Most Unusual Cases, another one-off documentary produced in 2006, featuring 20 especially memorable cases from the original run of Emergency Vets, including follow-ups with the veterinarians and the animal patients' owners
 E-Vets: Things Pets Swallow, another one-off documentary aired in 2007, focusing on memorable cases from the original run of Emergency Vets involving swallowed objects
E-Vet Interns, a series that aired in 2007, focusing on the lives of veterinary interns at Alameda East and the animals they treat

External links

Animal Planet's Emergency Vets homepage
VCA Animal Hospitals network

Hospital buildings completed in 1971
Veterinary hospitals
Buildings and structures in Denver
American companies established in 1971
1971 establishments in Colorado
Veterinary medicine in the United States
Hospitals in Colorado